Wilson is a satirical graphic novel by American cartoonist Daniel Clowes, published in 2010 by Drawn & Quarterly.  Starring the misanthropic Wilson, the book is structured as 70 one-page gag strips, with days or even years passing between the strips.  Clowes says, "The story is really what you interpret happens in between each strip." The middle-aged, divorced Wilson, who lives in Oakland, California, finds himself lonely, smug, and obsessed with his past. He is condescending and supercilious, and insists on communicating his alienating dissatisfactions with all those he meets, even with strangers, and most often unsolicited.

Overview
The style of artwork changes from strip to strip, sometimes in Clowes' familiar tight drawing style, sometimes more exaggeratedly cartoony. The story is told in one-page segments that can be read individually, while creating a larger whole.  It was printed with extremely thick and heavy cover boards. Wilson was the first book Clowes had published without first serializing it the way Ghost World and David Boring had first appeared in his comic book Eightball.

Wilson was inspired by a combination of spending time with his father, who was in the hospital with a terminal condition, while also reading a biography of Charles Schulz.  Clowes says his father and Schulz were alike in many ways, in physical and personality terms.  Clowes brought his sketchbook with him to the hospital, and there came up with the concept of Wilson and sketches of some of the strips that would end up in the final book. Clowes later described the character as "a guy I could put into any situation, and I would hear his voice and he would tell me what to write."

The book was optioned by director Alexander Payne in a deal that would have Clowes writing the screenplay. However, Payne stated in a Parade interview dated February 24, 2014 that he was no longer involved with the project.

The project was taken over by Fox Searchlight, and Wilson was filmed in Minneapolis/St. Paul, Minnesota in the summer of 2015, with Craig Johnson directing and Payne remaining on board as a producer. Woody Harrelson starred in the title role, and the film was released in 2017.

References

Works cited

External links
Preview at Drawn & Quarterly's website

2010 graphic novels
Drama comics
Comics set in the United States
Comics by Daniel Clowes
Drawn & Quarterly titles
San Francisco Bay Area literature
Novels set in Oakland, California
American novels adapted into films
American comics adapted into films